Barberena is a town, with a population of 47,093 (2018 census), and a municipality in Santa Rosa department of Guatemala.  Filled with local vendors and stores selling American goods, Barberena is a small town typical of the Guatemalan countryside.

Due to its close proximity to many rural communities, Barberena plays a central role in the local economy, especially as a point of exchange for agricultural goods and manufactured products.  The crime rate is especially high, as in much of Guatemala.

History

1913 earthquake

On Saturday 8 March 1913 and magnitude 6.4 earthquake hit Santa Rosa, destroying its department capital, Cuilapa. Both the initial quake and the replicas destroyed a lot of private homes, and also the cathedral and the prison, leaving behind significant human losses; similar destruction occurred at Barberena, Cerro Redondo, Llano Grande and El Zapote. Fraijanes, Pueblo Nuevo Viñas, Coatepeque and Jalpatagua were also affected. Around Cuilapa, there were landslides and road blockades, and even a long crack was reported at Los Esclavos hill.

Climate 

Barberena tropical climate (Köppen: Aw).

Geographic location 

Barberena is surrounded by Santa Rosa Department municipalities, except on the West, where it borders with Escuintla Department:

See also 
 
 
 List of places in Guatemala

Notes and references

References

Bibliography 

 

Municipalities of the Santa Rosa Department, Guatemala